The fourth supplementary elections for the National Assembly and Legislative Yuan were held in the Republic of China (Taiwan) on 6 December 1980.

Background
Originally these elections were scheduled for December 1978. They were postponed after the United States terminated diplomatic relations with the Republic of China just days before the elections were planned. They were subsequently held in December 1980. President Chiang Ching-kuo made agreements with Tangwai leaders and other independent politicians so they could compete for seats with Kuomintang candidates. These elections were the first competitive elections for Taiwan on a national level.

Compared with the last supplementary elections in 1972 for the National Assembly and 1975 for the Legislative Yuan, the number of eligible seats for the National Assembly increased from 53 to 76 and for the Legislative Yuan from 52 to 97. Of these, 70 seats representing Taiwan Province and the special municipalities of Taipei and Kaohsiung were to be elected directly. The remaining 27 seats representing overseas nationals were chosen by the President.

Results
Turnout for both the supplementary elections of the National Assembly and the Legislative Yuan was 66,4%. Of the newly elected members to the National Assembly, 61 belonged to the Kuomintang, one to 1 the Chinese Youth Party and 14 were independents. Of the 70 directly elected delegates to the Legislative Yuan, 56 belonged to the Kuomintang and 14 were independents. Of these independents 9 could be counted as  belonging to the Tangwai movement. All chosen were born Taiwanese except for 14 (7 in each of the legislative bodies) who were born on the Mainland or from parents from the Mainland.

Legislative Yuan

By constituency

National Assembly

References

Further reading
Copper, John F. and George P. Chen (1984), Taiwan’s Elections. Political Development and Democratization in the Republic of China, [Baltimore, Md.], Occasional Papers/Reprints Series in Contemporary Asian Studies, no. 5-1984 (64), 

Taiwan
Legislative elections in Taiwan
1980 elections in Taiwan
Election and referendum articles with incomplete results